Mortimer Community College is a coeducational secondary school in South Shields, South Tyneside, England. It takes pupils from the age of 11 to 16. It is a specialist Arts and Sports College.

The school teamed up with the National Glass Centre for  a project to design a large glass mural for the foyer of the school. The glass mural was unveiled by David Miliband, then the UK Foreign Secretary, on 19 March 2010.

Notable former pupils and staff
Perrie Edwards - Member of the band Little Mix
Sarah Millican - Comedian
Chris Cook - Olympic swimmer
Steve Simonsen - Professional goalkeeper
Katy McLean - Rugby Union player for England
John Barbour - inventor and manufacturer of the Barbour jacket
Jason Ainsley - Spennymoor manager

References

Secondary schools in the Metropolitan Borough of South Tyneside
Community schools in the Metropolitan Borough of South Tyneside
Education in South Shields